Hilbe is a German surname. Notable people with the surname include:

 Alfred Hilbe (1928–2011), Liechtenstein politician
 Joseph Hilbe (1944–2017), American statistician and philosopher

See also
 Hilse

German-language surnames